Hofbrauhaus Arolsen or Royal Brewery Arolsen is the oldest brewery in the Hesse federal state, located in Bad Arolsen town, Germany. Recent company name is "Hofbrauhaus Heinrich Brüne GmbH & Co. KG" and from 1910 is run by 4th generation of the Brüne family.

Beer was originally produced for the "Aroldessen" (old name for Arolsen) monastery and then for the court of the Count of Waldeck before city of Arolsen was founded.

See also 
List of oldest companies

External links 
Official website

1131 establishments in Europe
1130s establishments in Germany
Beer brands of Germany
Breweries in Germany